A grave is a location where a dead body (typically that of a human, although sometimes that of an animal) is buried or interred after a funeral. Graves are usually located in special areas set aside for the purpose of burial, such as graveyards or cemeteries.

Certain details of a grave, such as the state of the body found within it and any objects found with the body, may provide information for archaeologists about how the body may have lived before its death, including the time period in which it lived and the culture that it had been a part of.

In some religions, it is believed that the body must be burned or cremated for the soul to survive; in others, the complete decomposition of the body is considered to be important for the rest of the soul (see bereavement).

Description 

The formal use of a grave involves several steps with associated terminology.
Grave cut
The excavation that forms the grave. Excavations vary from a shallow scraping to removal of topsoil to a depth of 6 feet (1.8 metres) or more where a vault or burial chamber is to be constructed. However, most modern graves in the United States are only 4 feet deep as the casket is placed into a concrete box (see burial vault) to prevent a sinkhole, to ensure the grave is strong enough to be driven over, and to prevent floating in the instance of a flood.

Excavated soil
The material dug up when the grave is excavated. It is often piled up close to the grave for backfilling and then returned to the grave to cover it. As soil decompresses when excavated and space is occupied by the burial not all the volume of soil fits back in the hole, so often evidence is found of remaining soil.  In cemeteries this may end up as a thick layer of soil overlying the original ground surface.

Burial or interment
The body may be placed in a coffin or other container, in a wide range of positions, by itself or in a multiple burial, with or without personal possessions of the deceased.

Burial vault
A vault is a structure built within the grave to receive the body.  It may be used to prevent crushing of the remains, allow for multiple burials such as a family vault, retrieval of remains for transfer to an ossuary, or because it forms a monument.

Grave backfill
The soil returned to the grave cut following burial. This material may contain artifacts derived from the original excavation and prior site use, deliberately placed goods or artifacts or later material. The fill may be left level with the ground or mounded.

Monument or marker
Headstones are best known, but they can be supplemented by decorative edging, foot stones, posts to support items, a solid covering or other options.

Graveyards and cemeteries 

Graveyards were usually established at the same time as the building of the relevant place of worship (which can date back to the 8th to 14th centuries) and were often used by those families who could not afford to be buried inside or beneath the place of worship itself. In most cultures those who were vastly rich, had important professions, were part of the nobility or were of any other high social status were usually buried in individual crypts inside or beneath the relevant place of worship with an indication of the name of the deceased, date of death and other biographical data. In Europe this was often accompanied with a depiction of their family coat of arms.

Later graveyards have been replaced by cemeteries.

In Language 

 Turn in one's grave is an idiom to describe an extreme level of shock or an intense level of surprise and is expressed as the vicarious sentiment of a deceased person.

See also 
 Burial at sea
 Cenotaph
 Christian burial
 Church monuments
 Cremation
 Crypt
 Dolmen
 Funeral pyre
 Funerary art
 God's Acre
 Gravedigger
 Islamic burial
 Jewish burial
 Mass grave
 Maqbara
 Mausoleum
 Monumental inscription
 Natural burial
 Necropolis
 Premature burial
 Pyramid
 Tomb
 Tophet
 Tumulus
 Turn in one's grave
 War grave

References

External links 
 
 
 

Burial monuments and structures
Archaeological features